Booby's Bay  is a sandy beach near Padstow, Cornwall, England, UK. The beach is wide with many rock pools.  It is completely covered by high tide and is popular with surfers, though may be dangerous for the amateur. There is a lifeguard on duty during the summer, but the water is often red-flagged. Access to the beach is by climbing down from the coast path, or walking along the beach at low tide. Dogs are allowed on the beach all year round. Booby's Bay has no beach at the highest tides, the ribs of a wrecked ship appear periodically as the sand is relocated by the sea and prevailing currents. During World War I the three masted sailing ship Carl of the German navy was beached and abandoned in Constantine Bay while being towed to London during a storm.

References

Beaches of Cornwall
Bays of Cornwall